Abbès is a surname. Notable people with the surname include:

Frédéric Abbès, French archaeologist
Hachem Abbès (born 1986), Tunisian footballer